Valadez or Valadéz is a surname. Notable people with the surname include:

 Francisco Macías Valadéz, Mexican scouting leader
 Ismael Valadéz (born 1985), Mexican footballer
 Rebecca Valadez (born 1975), American singer and actress

See also
 Valdez (surname)